Aleksandr Zelenovsky (born 28 December 1972) is a Belarusian sailor. He competed in the Laser event at the 1996 Summer Olympics.

References

External links
 

1972 births
Living people
Belarusian male sailors (sport)
Olympic sailors of Belarus
Sailors at the 1996 Summer Olympics – Laser
Sportspeople from Minsk